Anthony Roiall Banks (born 23 October 1961) is a British businessman, author and Falklands veteran. He is the chairman and founder of the award-winning Balhousie Care Group, Scotland’s largest private residential care home provider. He is chairman of Business for Scotland and is a vocal supporter of Scottish Independence.

Early life and education 
Born 23 October 1961, Banks grew up the youngest of four children in Dundee. Banks’ father was an RAF logistics sergeant and his mother was a housewife. His first job was working as a newspaper delivery boy. He also worked as a refuse collector, a shelf stacker, a chicken catcher, an electrician’s assistant, and a raspberry picker.

Banks left school aged 17 to study accountancy at Abertay University, then known as Dundee Institute of Technology. He currently holds an honorary doctorate in Business Administration from the same university.

Career 
Banks joined the Territorial Army Parachute Regiment to supplement his student grant shortly after enrolling at the University of Abertay. He eventually left his course to join the Territorial Army full-time.

In 1982, Banks was sent to serve in the Falklands War as part of 2nd Battalion, Parachute Regiment (2 Para). His regiment was the first battalion to land and the first to win a major battle. Banks fought at the Battle of Goose Green and the Battle of Wireless Ridge and observed the Bluff Cove air attacks. He also witnessed the death of one of his closest friends during the Falklands War.

Banks is Honorary Colonel of the Territorial Army's 71 Engineer Regiment (Volunteers) and in 2013, he launched a website for those who lived through World War II to upload personal accounts. Banks is a donor and board member for Combat Stress, a charity which helps ex-servicemen and women affected by post-traumatic stress disorder.

Care homes 
After the war, Banks served with the Parachute Field Ambulance service before becoming an insurance and pensions salesman for Financial Planning Services.

Having achieved success in the sales industry and seeing how the private sector dealt with the country’s ageing population, Banks decided to move back to Scotland to build a family-run care home business.

Banks incorporated Balhousie Care Group and bought his first care home in 1991, Balhousie Lisden in Kirriemuir, Angus. After 12 years, the group consisted of three care homes with £1.5m turnover.

The group is Scotland’s largest private care home provider with 27 care facilities, employs more than 900 people and as of 2019 had a turnover of just under £40m.

Awards and recognition

In 2011, Banks was one of 12 recipients in Scotland of the Ernst & Young Entrepreneur of the Year award and was announced a finalist for Fundraiser of the Year 2011 at the Daily Record Hero Annual Awards. In 2012, Banks was named as one of the entrepreneurs chosen for Richard Branson’s panel which sought to select the world’s best business ideas.

Other awards Banks has received include Tayside Regional Director of the Year and Businessman of the Year at the Scottish SME Business Awards. He was also runner-up at the 2018 Institute of Scotland Director of the Year Awards.

Other business ventures

Banks’ other business interests include property development and the pharmacy sector. In July 2018, he revealed his plans to invest in the medicinal marijuana industry in the USA.

In the media

The Secret Millionaire 
In 2009, Banks appeared on the sixth series of Channel 4’s The Secret Millionaire in which he spent time living and getting to know residents on a low-income estate in Whitfield, Dundee. During the programme he donated to people he had met and has subsequently given more than £70,000 to organisations that he got to know during filming, including Daisy UK, a Liverpool-based organisation headed up by Dave Kelly.

From War to Peace 
In 2010, the BBC filmed a documentary entitled 'From War to Peace', in which a film crew followed Banks on a journey to Argentina. Banks had left the Falklands with a war trophy which he had kept for 28 years – a trumpet taken from an Argentinean prisoner of war named Omar Tabarez. With the help of a journalist who tracked down Tabarez, Banks visited him at his home in Argentina to hand back the trumpet.

Political activity 
Scottish independence

In May 2013, Banks joined the pro-independence Business for Scotland network where he remains chairman. He is a strong proponent for Scottish Independence and is an SNP donor.

Response to COVID-19

Banks has been widely published for his strong views on Scottish government support for care homes during the COVID-19 pandemic. He made the decision to lock down the group’s 26 care facilities on 11 March, 12 days before the nationwide lockdown. Banks insisted the care homes would not relax visiting rules until safer practices were in place to minimise risk of transmission of the virus.

In September 2020, Banks called on the government to review its mass staff testing policy for care home workers, noting slow test results for his 900+ staff. In December 2020, the first COVID-19 Pfizer vaccinations were distributed to care home residents in Balhousie North Inch care home in Perth, Tayside.

Writing career 
In March 2012, 30 years after the Falklands War, Banks released Storming the Falklands: My War and After. The book charts his experiences in war, how he struggled for years with combat-related stress, and how he has just recently managed to come to terms with his experiences.

References 

Living people
British Parachute Regiment officers
British Army personnel of the Falklands War
Businesspeople from Dundee
21st-century Scottish businesspeople
1961 births
Scottish nationalists